For the Winter Olympics, there are a total of 11 venues starting with the letter 'C', two venues starting with the letter 'D', three venues starting with the letter 'E', two venues starting with the letter 'F', and three letters starting with the letter 'F'.

C

D

E

F

G

References